Mediha Musliović (born 28 February 1975) is a Bosnian actress. She graduated in 1998 at the Academy of Performing Arts in Sarajevo.

Filmography

Films

TV series

External links

1975 births
Living people
Actresses from Sarajevo
Bosnia and Herzegovina film actresses
Bosnia and Herzegovina television actresses
21st-century Bosnia and Herzegovina actresses